British Lion or British Lions may refer to:

 British Lion, a national symbol of Great Britain

Sport
 British & Irish Lions, a touring side playing rugby union, known until 2001 as the British Lions
 Great Britain national rugby league team, formerly called and now nicknamed "The Lions"

Media
 British Lions (band), British rock band with former members of Mott the Hoople and Medicine Head, active 1977–1980
 British Lions (album), a 1978 debut album by the band of the same name
 British Lion (album), a 2012 album by Steve Harris
 British Lion (band), British band formed by Steve Harris
 British Lion Films, British film production company and distributor

See also
 British big cats, alleged big feline creatures living on the British Isles
 English lion (disambiguation)
 Scottish lion (disambiguation)
 The Lion and the Unicorn
 History of lions in Europe